The Tamdakht meteorite fell near Ouarzazate, Morocco on 20 December 2008 producing a strewn field of approximately  by  and two small impact craters, one of about  diameter and  depth at  and the other of about  diameter and  depth at .

The meteorite is named after a village close to the fall.

On April 22, 2017 small bits of the meteorite were handed out to children at the Boston March for Science.

Mineralogy 
Petrology: (by Albert Jambon, Omar Boudouma, D. Badia UPVI and M. Denise, MNHNP): 
Abundant chondrules with visible but not well-delimited outlines. Chondrule size is 0.1 to 1.5 mm. Dominant olivine and orthopyroxene. Abundant chromite, rare clinopyroxene and ilmenite. Numerous pockets with chromite, plagioclase and phosphate (merrilite and Cl-apatite). Kamacite, with deformed Neumann bands, and taenite, twinned troilite. Copper. Mode: metal+troilite 10%.

Mineral compositions and geochemistry: log χ = 5.3. Olivine Fa18 ± 0.5 Opx = En83 Fs16 Wo2 Minor calcic pyroxene. Plagioclase is Ab83–86 An5–15 Or7–2. Ca-phosphate (merrillite and Cl-apatite). Chromite: Cr# (100× molar Cr/[Cr + Al]) = 82. Metal: kamacite with 5% Ni and taenite with 36–47% Ni. Oxygen isotopes (C. Suavet, J. Gattacecca CEREGE): δ17O = 3.26‰, δ18O = 5.01‰, and Δ17O = 0.65‰. Magnetic susceptibility is log χ = 5.3 × 10–9 m3/kg.

Classification
Ordinary chondrite (H5), S3, W0.

Other
In 2016, the Cook Islands issued a collector coin in which a piece of the meteorite is embedded.

See also
 Glossary of meteoritics

References

See also
 Glossary of meteoritics
 

Meteorites found in Morocco
Chondrite meteorites